Henry N. Pontell is an American sociologist, currently a Distinguished Professor and past Chair at John Jay College, City University of New York, and also a published author.

Among his honors is an honorary professorship, the Cecil and Ida Green Honors Chair at Texas Christian University. He has served as the Vice President of the American Society of Criminology, of which he is also a fellow. He is the President of the White-Collar Crime Research Consortium at the National White Collar Crime Center.

References

City University of New York faculty
Stony Brook University alumni
University of California, Irvine faculty
Year of birth missing (living people)
Living people
American criminologists